Gedikdere is a village in the Tercan District, Erzincan Province, Turkey. The village is populated by Kurds of the Aşûran, Çarekan and Lolan tribes and had a population of 82 in 2021.

The hamlets of Alataş, Aslançayırı, Derviş, Kale, Yukarıgedikdere, Yusufbey and Yüceler are attached to the village.

References 

Villages in Tercan District
Kurdish settlements in Erzincan Province